The Bolva is a river in Kaluga and Bryansk Oblasts in Russia. It is a left tributary of the Desna. It is 213 km in length, with a drainage basin of 4340 km².

The river has its sources on the Smolensk Ridge, and flows in a southerly direction to its confluence with the Desna in the city of Bryansk. The river also flows through the towns of Dyatkovo, Fokino, Kirov and Lyudinovo.

In the 19th century, the river was navigable between Dyatkovo and Bryansk.

References 

Rivers of Bryansk Oblast
Rivers of Kaluga Oblast